The Conservation Foundation may refer to:

Australian Conservation Foundation (ACF)
African Conservation Foundation
Conservation Foundation, UK
Conservation Foundation (New York), founded 1948, merged into the World Wide Fund for Nature in 1990
The Conservation Foundation (Illinois), formerly the Forest Foundation of DuPage County

See also